The anterior ethmoidal nerve is a nerve of the nose. It is a branch of the nasociliary nerve, itself a branch of the ophthalmic nerve (V1). It provides sensory innervation to some structures around the nasal cavity.

Structure 
The anterior ethmoidal nerve is a terminal branch of the nasociliary nerve, a branch of the ophthalmic nerve (CN V1), itself a branch of the trigeminal nerve (CN V). It branches near the medial wall of the orbit. The anterior ethmoidal nerve arises only after the nasociliary has given off its four branches (the ramus communicans to the ciliary ganglion, the long ciliary nerves, the infratrochlear nerve, and the posterior ethmoidal nerve).

It travels through the anterior ethmoidal foramen to reach the anterior cranial fossa. It then moves forward and passes through the cribriform plate to enter the nasal cavity. It gives off branches to the roof of the nasal cavity, and bifurcates into a lateral internal nasal branch and medial internal nasal branch. It sends sensory fibers to the anterior ethmoid air cells and the middle ethmoidal air cells.

The anterior ethmoidal nerve then continues into the cranial cavity at the side of the cribiform plate of the ethmoid bone. It gives sensory fibers to the meninges. It then enters the nasal cavity via the nasal slit. Within the nose, it gives sensory fibers to the anterior part of the nasal septum.

The branches it gives rise to are called the internal/septal and external nasal branches of the anterior ethmoidal nerve, and the external branch ultimately innervates skin on the lateral sides of the nose.

Function 
The anterior ethmoidal nerve supplies sensation to the nasal septum. It also supplies sensation to part of the meninges. It is involved in the diving reflex.

References 

Ophthalmic nerve